The Oxford International Film Festival or OIFF (not to be confused with the Oxford International Film Festival, OXIFF, based in Oxford, England) was established in Oxford, Ohio in 2007 by founder and event director J.C. Schroder.

Festival History

The Oxford International Film Festival was created by independent film and event director/producer J.C. Schroder in the spring of 2006.  Schroder is the owner and producer of Star Com Productions, a film and live-events production company. He decided to create an outlet for filmmakers and audiences in the Southern Ohio, an area with no major film festival.

The first festival partnered with the Miami Association of Filmmakers and Independent Actors (M.A.F.I.A.), a filmmaking collaborative of the students at Miami University. The festival also included regional, national, and international support. It has become the largest major film festival in the region.

It was located near the campus of the university 40 miles north of Cincinnati. The first Oxford International Film Festival took place April 5–8, 2007 at the Marcum Conference Center. It garnered public interest and media attention across the globe. The festival received 530 entries from 41 countries globally in its first year.

The festival helped inspire the creation of the Miami Film Association (the name stemming from the Miami-Ohio River, which runs through the region) as a non-profit organization to manage the festival. The Miami Film Association is also dedicated to supporting a variety of year-round community and student film programs in the region.

Film events

The opening night film in its first year was the US Premiere of Wrath of Gods by Jon Gustafsson, which featured Gerard Butler, Stellan Skarsgård, and Sarah Polley, which also won the Audience Award for Best Documentary Feature.

Festival news

The Oxford International Film Festival was the largest international film event in the Ohio Valley region as of 2008.

The festival started out in Oxford but was scheduled to be held at the Savannah Center in West Chester, Ohio starting in 2009. The festival was considered one of the fastest growing festivals in the Midwest in 2008.

In 2009, MovieMaker Magazine listed the OIFF as one of its top 25 Film Festivals worth the fee.

Annual Dates
 April 5–8, 2007
 April 10–13, 2008
 July 23–26, 2009
 October 8–16, 2010

References

External links
 Oxford International Film Festival Official Website
 Star Com Productions Official Website
 M.A.F.I.A. Official Website
 Miami Valley Film Association Official Website

Film festivals in Ohio
Tourist attractions in Butler County, Ohio